Kuchisubo Dam is a dam in Mie Prefecture, Japan, completed in 1961.

References 

Dams in Mie Prefecture
Dams completed in 1961